Dorothea Blostein ( Haken) is a Canadian computer scientist who works as a professor of computer science at Queen's University. She has published well-cited publications on computer vision, image analysis, and graph rewriting, and is known as one of the authors of the master theorem for divide-and-conquer recurrences. Her research interests also include biomechanics and tensegrity.

Blostein is the daughter of mathematician Wolfgang Haken, and while she was in high school and college she helped check her father's proof of the four color theorem. 
She did her undergraduate studies at the University of Illinois at Urbana–Champaign, earning a B.Sc. in 1978, and then received a master's degree from Carnegie Mellon University in 1980. She returned to the University of Illinois for her doctoral studies, completing a Ph.D. in 1987 under the supervision of Narendra Ahuja.

Her husband, Steven D. Blostein, is a professor of electrical and computer engineering at Queen's University.

Selected publications

References

External links

Year of birth missing (living people)
Living people
Canadian computer scientists
Canadian women computer scientists
University of Illinois Urbana-Champaign alumni
Carnegie Mellon University alumni
Academic staff of Queen's University at Kingston